Bunara is a village in the municipality of Petrovac, Republika Srpska, Bosnia and Herzegovina.

Demographics 
According to the 2013 census, its population was 39, all Serbs.

References

Populated places in Bosanski Petrovac
Serb communities in the Federation of Bosnia and Herzegovina